Bristow Township is one of nine townships in Boyd County, Nebraska, United States. The population was 106 at the 2020 census. A 2021 estimate placed the township's population at 105.

The Village of Bristow lies within the Township.

References

External links
City-Data.com

Townships in Boyd County, Nebraska
Townships in Nebraska